The 2017 Netball Superleague season (known for sponsorship reasons as the Vitality Netball Superleague) was the twelfth season of the Netball Superleague. The league was won by Wasps. In the grand final Wasps defeated regular season winners, Loughborough Lightning.

Teams
The 2017 season saw the number of teams expand from eight to ten. In June 2016 England Netball announced that Yorkshire Jets had lost their place in the league. At the same time, they also announced that three new franchises, Severn Stars, Scottish Sirens and Wasps would be joining.

Regular season

Final table
Loughborough Lightning finished top of the table after winning seventeen of their eighteen matches. Wasps were the only team to beat Lightning in the regular season.

Final Four
The two play-off semi-finals, the 3rd/4th place play-off and the grand final were all played at Barclaycard Arena on the Final Four weekend. The Final Four was originally due to be hosted at Manchester Arena but was switched to the Barclaycard Arena following the Manchester Arena bombing.

Semi-final

3rd/4th place play-off

Grand Final

See also
 2017 Team Bath netball season

References

 
2017
2017 in English netball
2017 in Welsh women's sport
2017 in Scottish women's sport